Bervie railway station served the town of Inverbervie, Aberdeenshire, Scotland from 1865 to 1966 on the Montrose and Bervie Railway.

History 
The station opened as Bervie on 1 November 1865 by the Scottish North Eastern Railway. It was the northern terminus of the line, situated north of Gourdon station. The goods yard was to the east and there was a locomotive shed nearby as well as a carriage siding to the south of the platform. The station's name was changed to Inverbervie on 5 July 1926. The station closed to regular passenger services in 1951, but continued to be used for goods trains until the last train (which was a passenger train to mark the occasion of the final closure of the station) ran on 22 May 1966.

References

External links 
 http://lightmoor.co.uk/books/the-montrose-bervie-railway/L9969
 https://www.flickr.com/photos/irishswissernie/45379911341

Disused railway stations in Aberdeenshire
Former North British Railway stations
Railway stations in Great Britain opened in 1865
Railway stations in Great Britain closed in 1966
1865 establishments in Scotland
1951 disestablishments in Scotland
Inverbervie